

The CEA-308 is a Brazilian sports aircraft designed by Paulo Iscold, that beat four FAI World Records with pilot Gúnar Armin Halboth.

Design and development
The CEA-308, is an aircraft composed of fiberglass and wood, covered by extruded polystyrene foam plates. The wing spar is made of freijó, manufactured in plywood. A 64 HP Rotax 532 engine was used for flight tests, and later a 100 HP Hirth engine was installed, enabling the aircraft to reach speeds of up to 400 km/h. After some time it was decided to replace the engine with a Jabiru, which is the one that remains in the aircraft to this day. It has a three-blade propeller, also built by Hirth.

Records
Time to Climb to 3,000 Meters: 8 min 15 sec.
Speed Over a 15 Kilometer Course: 329.1 km/h
Speed Over a 100 Kilometer Closed Course: 326.8 km/h
Speed Over a 3 Kilometer Course: 360.13 km/h

Specification

See also

References

External links
 

2000s Brazilian sport aircraft
Low-wing aircraft
Single-engined tractor aircraft
T-tail aircraft
Aircraft first flown in 2002